Chumaki is a rural locality (a khutor) in Starooskolsky District, Belgorod Oblast, Russia. The population was 37 as of 2010. There are 5 streets.

Geography 
Chumaki is located 15 km east of Stary Oskol (the district's administrative centre) by road. Kotovo is the nearest rural locality.

References 

Rural localities in Starooskolsky District